Brušperk is a town in Frýdek-Místek District in the Moravian-Silesian Region of the Czech Republic. It has about 4,100 inhabitants. The historic town centre is well preserved and is protected by law as an urban monument zone.

Etymology
The town was originally named Brunsberg, meaning "Bruno's hill". It was named after its founder, bishop Bruno von Schauenburg.

Geography
Brušperk is located in the Moravian-Silesian Foothills in a relatively flat terrain. The Ondřejnice River flows through the town.

History

The first written mention of Brušperk is from 1270, when it was already referred to as a town. A document mentioning Brušperk in 1269 is a forgery. The town was probably founded in 1267 or 1268. It was one of the administrative and market centres of the Hukvaldy estate. The town received many privileges from the bishops of Olomouc, including the privilege of building town fortifications.

After the suppression of the serf revolt in 1598–1599, the Protestant Brušperk again became a predominantly Catholic town by the end of the 17th century. The re-Catholicization was most intense especially during the Thirty Years' War. Brušperk was one of the most affected towns by the war. Between 1619 and 1627 it was looted several times, after the occupation by the Swedes in 1643 the population was partly murdered and the buildings destroyed.

The town recovered from the war damage at the beginning of the 18th century. The development of drapery production, which soon became the main craft, played a large part in the renewal of the town. Brušperk was expanding, but the development ended in the 1830s, when industry began to develop in the surrounding towns and the importance of Brušperk thus partially decreased.

Demographics

Sights

In the centre of the historic core is the J. A. Komenského Square with Baroque statues of the Holy Trinity and St. John of Nepomuk, and with burgher houses with preserved arcades. The area of the church is surrounded by a wall and containts the Stations of the Cross.

A historical monument is a Dutch-type windmill, built around 1830. The blades and technical equipment of the mill have not been preserved.

References

External links

Cities and towns in the Czech Republic
Populated places in Frýdek-Místek District